3 A.M. is a 2001 crime film written and directed by Lee Davis and starring Danny Glover, Pam Grier, Sergej Trifunović, and Michelle Rodriguez. It is the first film written and directed by Lee Davis, a protégé of director Spike Lee. The film follows the lives of several New York taxi drivers.

Plot
New York City taxi drivers Hershey, Rasha, and Salgado all work for the same company. Their boss, known as Box, warns Rasha that she will fire him if he has another accident. He causes two accidents and is convinced he has killed a boy in the second one. With the help of Hershey and Cathy, a masseuse and prostitute he often visits, he flees back to his native Bosnia and Herzegovina, although he narrowly escaped death there, and some of his relatives were killed. Shortly before he leaves the US, he reads in the paper that the boy has survived.

After a failed marriage, Hershey is reluctant to commit to his girlfriend George. She in turn is concerned he might become the next victim of a cabbie killer who has already murdered 11 taxi drivers.

Salgado was forced into prostitution when she was 12 years old. She was traumatized and killed her first customer. Now she thinks her passenger has a guardian devil who is after her, so she shoots him dead although he is begging for his life.

While Hershey is driving Rasha to the airport, they meet Salgado, whose taxi has broken down. They help her, unaware that she has just disposed of her passenger's body. She drops her gun in Hershey's taxi without noticing.

Held at gunpoint by the cabbie killer, Hershey kills him with Salgado's gun. He proposes to George, and she tells him to ask her again the following week.

Box, who has been trying to get a loan from her bank so that her company can stay in business, manages to secure it with the help of her brother, who works for the bank.

Cast
Danny Glover as Hershey
Pam Grier as George
Sergej Trifunović as Rasha Andrić
Michelle Rodriguez as Salgado
Sarita Choudhury as Box
Aasif Mandvi as Singh
Bobby Cannavale as Jose
John Ortiz as Hector
Marika Domińczyk as Cathy
Isaach de Bankolé as Angus

References

External links

2001 films
American crime films
2000s crime films
Films about taxis
2001 directorial debut films
Films set in New York City
2000s American films